Bradley Lamar Colburn (born February 10, 1987), better known by his online alias theRadBrad, is an American YouTuber and Let's Player most notable for his video game walkthroughs of various new games. He has been interviewed by various publications since becoming active in 2010. As of February 2023, Colburn's channel has over 13.30 million subscribers and his videos have brought in over 5.95 billion views. Footage and images from his gameplay videos have been used for illustrative purposes in articles by numerous publications.

Colburn has been covered by various publications, including VG247 (when video game publisher Ubisoft sent him merchandise ahead of the launch of Watch Dogs 2), VentureBeat, and Rolling Stone. FMV Magazine has referred to Colburn as "king of the YouTube walkthrough."

During a wave of copyright issues that were affecting creators, some of Colburn's videos were falsely claimed by an automated system owned by the multi-channel network Scale Lab. He was directly apologized to by Scale Lab's CEO, David Brenner, in a Kotaku interview once the problem was discovered. During a 2018 interview with Rolling Stone, Colburn's YouTube channel was identified by Susan Wojcicki, the CEO of YouTube, as one of the "top gaming creators" on the platform.

References 

1987 births
Living people
American YouTubers
Gaming YouTubers
YouTube channels launched in 2010
Video game commentators
Let's Players